São Martinho Grande is a settlement in the southern part of the island of Santiago, Cape Verde, and part of the municipality Ribeira Grande de Santiago. It is 4 km east from Cidade Velha and 6.5 km west of Praia city centre. National road EN1-ST05 (Praia - Cidade Velha) passes north of it. 1.5 km to its south is Calheta de São Martinho, a small bay of the Atlantic Ocean. It was mentioned as "Kalyete de S. Martin" on the 1747 map by Jacques-Nicolas Bellin.

References

Villages and settlements in Santiago, Cape Verde
Ribeira Grande de Santiago